Spătaru may refer to:

Places in Romania
 Spătaru, Buzău, a village in Costeşti Commune, Buzău County
 Spătaru, Olt, a village in Cungrea Commune, Olt County

People
Arina Spătaru
Dan Spătaru